Károly Pál (born 13 January 1951) is a politician in Serbia from the country's Hungarian national minority community. He has at different times served in the National Assembly of Serbia and the Assembly of Vojvodina and has held high municipal office in Mali Iđoš. For most of his political career, Pál has been a member of the Alliance of Vojvodina Hungarians (Vajdasági Magyar Szövetség, VMSZ).

Private career
Pál is an economist from the village of Feketić in Mali Iđoš, Vojvodina.

Politician

At the republic and provincial levels
Pál ran for the Serbian national assembly in the 1990 parliamentary election in the division of "Bačka Topola and Mali Iđoš," with endorsements from the Union of Reform Forces of Yugoslavia in Vojvodina (Savez reformskih snaga Jugoslavije, SRSJ), the Association for the Yugoslav Democratic Initiative (Udruženje za jugoslovensku/jugoslavensku demokratsku inicijativu, UJDI), and the League of Social Democrats – Yugoslavia (Liga socijaldemokrata Vojvodine, LSV). He was defeated Sándor Nagy of the Democratic Fellowship of Vojvodina Hungarians (Vajdasági Magyarok Demokratikus Közössége , VMDK).

He was elected to the Vojvodina assembly for Mali Iđoš in the December 1992 provincial election with endorsements from the VMDK and the Reform Democratic Party of Vojvodina (Reformska demokratska stranka Vojvodine, RDSV). He took his seat when the assembly convened in 1993 and served for the next four years. The Socialist Party of Serbia (Socijalistička partija Srbije, SPS) won the election, and Pál served in opposition. He joined the VMSZ when the party was formed in 1994 and was not re-elected in the 1996 provincial election.

Pál appeared in the fourth position on the VMSZ's electoral list for Subotica in the 1997 Serbian parliamentary election. The list received three mandates, and he was not included in the party's assembly delegation. (From 1992 to 2000, Serbia's electoral law stipulated that one-third of parliamentary mandates would be assigned to candidates from successful lists in numerical order, with the remaining two-thirds distributed amongst other candidates on the lists at the discretion of the sponsoring parties. Pál could have been awarded a mandate despite his list position, though in the event he was not.))

The VMSZ subsequently participated in the 2000 Serbian parliamentary election as part of the Democratic Opposition of Serbia (Demokratska opozicija Srbije, DOS), a broad and ideologically diverse coalition of parties opposed to Slobodan Milošević's administration. Pál appeared in the 115th position on the alliance's list and was given a mandate when the list won a majority victory with 176 out of 250 seats. (From 2000 to 2011, all parliamentary mandates were awarded to sponsoring parties or coalitions rather than to individual candidates, and it was common practice for the mandates to be distributed out of numerical order. Pál did not receive an automatic mandate on the basis of his list position.) He took his seat when the assembly met in January 2001 and served as a supporter of the administration for the next three years.

For the 2003 parliamentary election, the VMSZ joined the Together for Tolerance ( Zajedno za toleranciju, ZZT) alliance, and Pál was given the 153rd position on their combined list. The list did not cross the electoral threshold to win representation in the assembly. Pál's parliamentary term ended when the new assembly convened in January 2004. He later appeared on the VMSZ's list in the 2007 parliamentary election and the VMSZ-led Hungarian Coalition (Magyar Koalíció , MK) list in the 2008 parliamentary election, though he did not receive a mandate on either occasion.

Municipal politics
The VMSZ won a majority victory in Mali Iđoš in the 2000 Serbian local elections. After the election, Pál was chosen as president of the municipality's executive board (i.e., effectively the municipality's first minister).

He received the lead position on the VMSZ's list for Mali Iđoš in the 2004 local elections. The party won a plurality victory and emerged as the dominant party in a local coalition government; Pál was chosen as president (i.e., speaker) when the assembly convened. In 2005, he made the controversial decision to allow the Montenegrin Orthodox Church to construct a place of worship in the municipality; this decision was opposed by the Serbian government, on the grounds that the church was not recognized. Pál was given the fourth position on the Hungarian Coalition's list for Mali Iđoš in the 2008 Serbian local elections, in which the alliance won another plurality victory, and was chosen afterwards for another term as assembly president.

Serbia's electoral law was reformed in 2011, such that mandates were awarded to candidates on successful lists in numerical order. Pál received the second position on the VMSZ's list in the 2012 local elections and was elected to another term when the list won eight seats. The Democratic Party (Demokratska stranka, DS) later formed a coalition government without the VMSZ, and Pál charged that the DS had broken a pre-election pact. He did not seek re-election in 2016.

Party and community activism
Pál has served several terms as a VMSZ vice-president and has been an executive member of Serbia's Hungarian National Council. In February 2016, he oversaw the expulsion of several leading figures from the party, including a current and former mayor of Subotica.

Electoral record

National Assembly of Serbia

References

1951 births
Living people
People from Mali Iđoš
Members of the National Assembly (Serbia)
Members of the Assembly of Vojvodina
Members of the Hungarian National Council (Serbia)
Alliance of Vojvodina Hungarians politicians